Ammasandra (sometimes referred to as Adityapatna) is a small township in Turuvekere taluk, Tumkur district in the state of Karnataka, India.

Demographics
 India census,.  workers. Ammasandra had a population of 4236. Males constitute 51% of the population and females 49%. Adityapatna has an average literacy rate of 82%, higher than the national average of 59.5%: with 54% of the males and 46% of females literate. In Ammasandra, 7% of the population is under 6 years of age.

References

Villages in Tumkur district